
Gmina Ropczyce is an urban-rural gmina (administrative district) in Ropczyce-Sędziszów County, Subcarpathian Voivodeship, in south-eastern Poland.

Villages
Apart from the town of Ropczyce, Gmina Ropczyce contains the villages and settlements of Brzezówka, Gnojnica, Łączki Kucharskie, Lubzina, Mała, Niedźwiada and Okonin.

Neighbouring gminas
Gmina Ropczyce is bordered by the gminas of Brzostek, Dębica, Ostrów, Sędziszów Małopolski and Wielopole Skrzyńskie.

References
Polish official population figures 2006

Ropczyce
Ropczyce-Sędziszów County